The Sheriff is a 1918 American short comedy film directed by and starring Roscoe "Fatty" Arbuckle. The film is considered to be lost.

Cast
 Roscoe 'Fatty' Arbuckle as Cook
 Betty Compson as School Teacher
 Monty Banks  (credited as his real name Mario Bianchi)
 Glen Cavender
 Luke the Dog
 Ernest Morrison
 Mildred Reardon as Lady

See also
 Fatty Arbuckle filmography
 Betty Compson filmography

References

External links

1918 films
1918 comedy films
1918 short films
1918 lost films
American silent short films
American black-and-white films
Silent American comedy films
American comedy short films
Films directed by Roscoe Arbuckle
Films with screenplays by Roscoe Arbuckle
Lost American films
Lost comedy films
1910s American films